The women's 1500 metres event at the 1974 British Commonwealth Games was held on 31 January and 2 February at the Queen Elizabeth II Park in Christchurch, New Zealand.

Medalists

Results

Heats
Held on 31 January

Qualification: First 4 in each heat (Q) qualify directly for the final.

Final
Held on 2 February

References

Heats results

Athletics at the 1974 British Commonwealth Games
1974